San Bendetto del Querceto is a small town in the Province of Bologna, in Italy.

Cities and towns in Emilia-Romagna
Municipalities of the Metropolitan City of Bologna